Chru may refer to

 Chru people, an ethnic group in Vietnam
 Chru language, their language

See also 
 Churu (disambiguation)